The 2006 Singapore Open (officially known as the Aviva Open Singapore 2006 for sponsorship reasons) was a five-star badminton tournament that took place at Singapore Indoor Stadium in Singapore, from June 5 to June 11, 2006. The total prize money on offer was US$170,000.

Venue
 Singapore Indoor Stadium

Final results

Men's singles

Women's singles

Men's doubles

Women's doubles

Mixed doubles

External links
Full results from Tournamentsoftware.com

Singapore Open
Singapore Open (badminton)
2006 in Singaporean sport